GPH may refer to:

 3GPH, a radio station in Australia
 GamePark Holdings, a South Korean electronics company
 Grand Pacific Hotel (Fiji)
 Greenslopes Private Hospital, in Brisbane, Australia
 Guanidinopropionase, an enzyme that catalyzes the chemical reaction
 Midwest National Air Center, in Missouri, United States
 Glycophorin, a protein found on red blood cells